Emil Jensen (born 19 June 1979) is a Swedish professional footballer defender who is currently free agent.

Career
Started his career in BK Astrio and, as many others talented players, moved in 1994 to local rivals Halmstads BK's youth team, had to wait until 2001 for his first league game, IFK Norrköping (4-0), was for some time constantly in the team's line-up, but during a training session in 2006 his anterior cruciate ligament was torn. This kept him out of the entire 2007 soccer season and he also missed the major part of the 2008 season due to this, he only played one game in 2008 against IFK Luleå in Svenska Cupen. Fully healed prior to the 2009 season, he had only played in friendly and cup matches for Halmstads BK. On 3 November 2009 Halmstas BK announced that they would not renew his contract hand he would leave the club.

On 12 December 2009 Falkenbergs FF confirmed that they had signed a contract with Emil Jensen.

When Emil was born his father, John Jensen, played in Allsvenskan with IS Halmia.

Achievements

Halmstads BK:
 Allsvenskan:
 Stora Silvret (2nd): 2004

References

External links
  
  (archive)
 
 

1979 births
Living people
Swedish footballers
Association football defenders
Allsvenskan players
Halmstads BK players